Bucky Fellini is the third studio album by The Dead Milkmen. It was released in 1987 by Enigma. The album peaked at No. 163 on the Billboard 200.

The album produced one single, "Instant Club Hit (You'll Dance to Anything)". An EP was released containing the single and multiple remixes, as well as previously unreleased tracks. That track and two others from Bucky Fellini appeared on the 1997 compilation Death Rides a Pale Cow: The Ultimate Collection; two were included on the 1998 compilation Cream of the Crop. 

"I Am The Walrus" is not a cover version of The Beatles song. "Watching Scotty Die" was covered by Mischief Brew in 2008 on their split with the Milkmen's Joe Jack Talcum.

Production
The album was produced by Brian "Mud Lounge" Beattie. It contains a cover of Daniel Johnston's "Rocketship".

Critical reception
Trouser Press wrote that "the relatively expansive Bucky Fellini — with guest musicians, improved songwriting and such dementedly parodic cultural concepts as 'Nitro Burning Funny Cars', 'Going to Graceland', '(Theme from) Blood Orgy of the Atomic Fern' — coughed up the clever 'Instant Club Hit (You'll Dance to Anything)'." The Chicago Tribune wrote that the album "weaves touches of country and surf music into a brand of rock that is heavily influenced by punk but is less intense than the usual hammering hard-core assault." The Orlando Sentinel wrote: "Unfortunately, a comic bent leads to the labeling of bands as novelty acts, a commercial death trap. On Bucky Fellini, the Dead Milkmen avoid the trap, expanding their basic sound with touches of violin, lap steel guitar and dobro." 

People thought that "the Dead Milkmen aren't as stupid as they'd like to be ... Now they sound as if they might know how to play their guitars, and they produce some on-target commentary such as 'Instant Club Hit (You'll Dance to Anything)'." The Washington Post opined that "though musically fuller and more diverse than the band's two previous albums, two sides of Bucky Fellini may be more youthful cynicism than most people would want to sit through in one listening." The Toronto Star deemed the album "a sarcastic masterpiece that takes the mickey out of a dozen cherished American icons."

Track listing
All songs written by The Dead Milkmen unless otherwise noted:

"The Pit" - 2:19
"Take Me to the Specialist" - 2:17
"I Am the Walrus" - 2:02
"Watching Scotty Die" - 2:43
"Going to Graceland" - 2:35
"Big Time Operator" (Duane Houser, J.D. Miller) - 2:53
"Instant Club Hit (You'll Dance to Anything)" - 3:37
"The Badger Song" - 2:18
"Tacoland" - 1:35
"City of Mud" - 1:58
"Rocketship" (Daniel Johnston) - 2:48
"Nitro Burning Funny Cars" - 2:45
"Surfin' Cow" - 3:34
"(Theme From) Blood Orgy of the Atomic Fern" - 2:18
"Jellyfish Heaven" - 2:10
(untitled instrumental) - 0:34 [Hidden Track]

Musicians

The Dead Milkmen
Dave Schulthise (Dave Blood) – bass, percussion, backing vocals, sampler
Rodney Linderman (Rodney Anonymous) – vocals, guitar
Joseph Genaro (Joe Jack Talcum) – guitar, vocals, whistling tube of plastic, piano, Dobro, sampler
Dean Sabatino (Dean Clean) – drums, percussion, backing vocals, drum machine, sampler

Additional Sounds
Brian Beattie – lap steel, percussion, backing vocals
K. McCarty – violin, backing vocals
Dave Cameron – percussion
David Reckner – power saw, backing vocals
Lee Woulfe – sample source
Sheri Lane – backing vocals
Kim Cook – backing vocals
Dan Mapp – backing vocals

References

The Dead Milkmen albums
1988 albums